Dead Start Program is the eleventh studio album by American Techno DJ/producer John Tejada. It was released in February 2018 under Kompakt. Dead Start Program was also the name of the 2007 EP by Irish electronic music act Dark Room Notes. The cover of Tejada’s album references the same image that DRN took their EP name from, 11 years before Tejada. https://www.sputnikmusic.com/review/13545/Dark-Room-Notes-Dead-Start-Program/

Track listing

External links
Dead Start Program at Kompakt

References

2018 albums
John Tejada albums
Kompakt albums